The Encyclical of the Eastern Patriarchs is a letter issued in May 1848 by the four Eastern patriarchs of the Eastern Orthodox Church, who met at Council in Constantinople. It was addressed to all Eastern Orthodox Christians, as a response against Pope Pius IX's Epistle to the Easterners which had been issued in January (1848). 

The encyclical was solemnly addressed to "All the Bishops Everywhere, Beloved in the Holy Ghost, Our Venerable, Most Dear Brethren; and to their Most Pious Clergy; and to All the Genuine Orthodox Sons of the One, Holy, Catholic, and Apostolic Church". The encyclical explicitly denounces the Filioque clause added by Rome to the Nicene Creed as a heresy, censures the papacy for missionizing among Eastern Orthodox Christians, and repudiates Ultramontanism (papal supremacy). It also describes the Roman Catholic Church as being in apostasy, heresy, and schism.

In the course of all this, it notably makes reference to the Fourth Council of Constantinople (879-880) as being the eighth ecumenical council.

Signatories 
 Patriarch Anthimus VI of Constantinople
 Pope and Patriarch Hierotheus II of Alexandria
 Patriarch Methodius of Antioch
 Patriarch Cyril II of Jerusalem
 The Holy Synod in Constantinople
 The Holy Synod in Antioch
 The Holy Synod in Jerusalem

See also 
Eastern Orthodoxy
Theological differences between the Catholic Church and the Eastern Orthodox Church
Ecclesiastical differences between the Catholic Church and the Eastern Orthodox Church

References

Sources

External links
 Full text of the Encyclical

19th-century Christian texts
1848 in Christianity
19th-century Eastern Orthodoxy
1848 documents
Letters (message)
Filioque